Bogislaw was a silver coin minted in the Duchy of Pomerania, during the reign of Bogislaw X. It was worth ½ mark, 8 shillings or 1/6 guilder. It was first minted in 1500 in Szczecin.

Description 
Originally it weighed 4.57 g (0.16 oz), 4.32 g (0.15 oz) of which was pure silver. Later, its mass was increased to 4.86 g (0.17 oz), while the mass of silver itself was decreased to 4.29 g (0.15 oz). Its diameter was 32 mm (1.3 inch).

On the obverse, the coin had an image of Mary of Nazareth with the inscription "CONSERVANOS•DOMINA", while on the reverse it had the coat of arms with long cross and inscription that read: "BOGVSLAVS•DUX•STETIN [or STETIEN]•MVC".

Notes

References

Bibliography 
Leksykon numizmatyczny by Andrzej Mikołajczyk. Warsaw/Łódź. Wydawnictwo Naukowe PWN. 1994.

Medieval currencies
Silver coins
Coins of Poland
Coins of Germany